Hepcat is a ska and reggae band formed in southern California in 1989. Their soulful harmonies and mellow rhythms were unlike those of contemporaries and more akin to musicians from the heyday of 1960s Jamaican ska (also referred to as the first wave) with elements of soul, jazz and R&B.

Career
Hepcat's debut album, Out of Nowhere was released in 1993 on the New York-based ska label Moon Records. Two years later, they followed it up with Scientific on BYO Records. In 1998, after signing with Epitaph Records subsidiary HellCat Records, they released Right on Time, scoring a modest hit with the swinging "No Worries" and scored a spot on the Vans Warped Tour. 2000 saw the release of Push n' Shove, their first album without founding members Raul Talavera and Alex Désert, although the latter appears as a guest vocalist on two tracks. He rejoined the band in 2003. 

By the early 2000s, the ska scene became oversaturated and commercially less interesting, so the band was dropped by their label. Hepcat went on a hiatus, then reunited in 2003 and continued touring. In 2007, the long-time bassist David Fuentes died, which resulted in the band being less active again. In 2015, the guitarist Aaron Owens died as well. Hepcat continues performing at concerts and festivals, but infrequently.

A few members of Hepcat have also participated in other endeavors. Trumpeter Kincaid Smith formed Soul Traffic, a five-piece funk band. Vocalist Alex Désert has had a successful career in film and television, appearing in the movies PCU, Swingers, and High Fidelity; and the television shows Boy Meets World and Becker.

The term "Hepcat" originates from an early slang term (1930–35) pertaining to an admirer or devotee of jazz, esp. swing, or one that was "hep", or a hipster. The band is actually named after a cat once owned by vocalist Alex Desért, named "Hep."

Discography
Out of Nowhere (1993), Moon Ska Records
Scientific (1996), BYO Records
Right on Time (1998), Hellcat Records
Push 'n Shove (2000), Hellcat Records
Out of Nowhere (Hellcat re-release with two bonus tracks) (2004)
Live at The Whiskey a Go-Go (2011), Whatevski Records

Current members (as of 2021)
Greg Lee - vocals
Alex Désert - vocals
Deston Berry - keys and vocals
Efren Santana - tenor sax (joined on Scientific)
Kincaid Smith - trumpet, flugelhorn (joined on Scientific)
Lino Trujillo - guitar (from Scientific)
Greg Narvas - drums and percussion (Out of Nowhere and Scientific)

Past members
David Fuentes - bass, E. upright (1971–2007)
Joey "Pepe" Urquijo - bass ("Nigel" and "Club Meditation" — first single)
Raul Talavera - alto sax (through Right on Time)
Dave Hillyard - tenor sax (Out of Nowhere)
Joey Aguilera - guitar (Scientific Tour)
Dennis Wilson - guitar (Out of Nowhere)
Jeremiah BenZion (Settles) - tenor sax (Out of Nowhere)
Aaron Owens - guitar (credited as an additional musician on Right on Time, joined on Push n' Shove)
Chris Castanon - drums (in between Scientific and Push n' Shove)
Scott Abels - drums and percussion (credited as an additional musician on Right on Time, joined on Push n' Shove)

References

Hellcat Records artists
Third-wave ska groups
American ska musical groups
Musical groups established in 1989
BYO Records artists